The Ashanti Region is located in southern part of Ghana and it is the third largest of 16 administrative regions, occupying a total land surface of  or 10.2 percent of the total land area of Ghana. In terms of population, however, it is the most populated region with a population of 4,780,380 according to the 2011 census, accounting for 19.4% of Ghana's total population. The Ashanti Region is known for its major gold bar and cocoa production.  The largest city and regional capital is Kumasi.

Geography

Location and size
The Ashanti Region is centrally located in the middle belt of Ghana. It lies between longitudes 0.15W and 2.25W, and latitudes 5.50N and 7.46N.  The region shares boundaries with six of the sixteen political regions, Bono, Bono East and Ahafo Regions in the north, Eastern region in the east, Central region in the south and Western region in the South west. The region is divided into 27 districts, each headed by a District Chief Executive.

Economy

Tourism

Parks 
Bobiri Forest Butterfly Sanctuary
Bomfobiri Wildlife Sanctuary
Digya National Park
Kogyae Strict Nature Reserve
Owabi Forest Reserve and Bird Sanctuary

Recreation areas 
Centre for National Culture
Rattray Park

Historic sites 
 Komfo Anokye Sword site
 Manhyia Palace Museum
 Kumasi Fort and Military Museum
 Armed Forces Museum
 The Prempeh II Jubilee Museum
 The Asante Traditional Buildings
Yaa Asantewaa Museum

Festivals

Several festivals are celebrated in the region, the major ones being the Akwasidae and Adae Kese. These are religious festivals celebrated by some members of the Akan ethnic group of which the Ashanti belong.
The festivals are celebrated to remember past leaders and heroes. Though they are dead, their spirits are believed to be alive and taking interest in the affairs of the living, watching their actions, and consulting with them during the Adae festival.
Papa Festival
Kente Festival
Yaa Asantewaa Festival
Mmoa Nni Nko Festival
Nkyidwo Festival

Other tourist attractions

Kejetia Market
 Patakro shrine
 Adinkra cloth printing in Ntonso
Adanwomase Kente Village
Bonwire Kente Village
 Ahwiaa Woodcarving Village

Demographics

Population
The center of population of the Ashanti Region is located in the Kumasi Metropolitan District. According to the 2000 census, the region had a population of 3,612,950, making it the most populous region; however, its density (148.1 per square km) is lower than that of Central (162.2/km2) Region. Majority of Ashanti region's population are Ethnic Akans and citizens by birth (94.2%) with five per cent naturalized Ghanaians. A smaller proportion (5.8%) of the population originate from outside Ashanti and Akanland or Ghana, made up of 3.7 per cent mainly from the five English-speaking countries of ECOWAS and 2.1 per cent from other African countries. The non-African population living in the region is 1.8 per cent of the total population.
Akans are the predominant ethnic group in the region, representing 94.2% of citizens by birth. A high proportion (82.9%) of the Akan population is Ashanti.

Transport
The Ashanti region is served by the Kumasi Airport, which handles domestic flights.  Five national highways – N4, N6, N8, N10 and N6 – and a few regional highways such as the R52 and R106 serve the region.

The N6 connects Kumasi via Kwame Nkrumah Circle and through Nsawam and N4 to Accra.  The region is also connected to the Central Region by the N8 and N10, both of which originate from Yemoransa in the Central Region. The N10, however, connects the regional capital of Kumasi.

Education

Senior high schools

Tweneboah Kodua Secondary School- Akyerema(TKSS)
 Dadease Senior High School, Dadease
 Akomadan Senior High School, Akomadan
 Dompoase Senior High School, Dompoasi
 Afia Kobi Ampem Girls (Royal AKAGSHS)
 Adanwomase SENIOR High School (ADASS)
 Agogo State College, Agogo Asante-Akyem
 Agona SDA Senior High School, Agona
 Anglican Senior High School, Kumasi
 Asanteman School (Real Assas)
 Bankoman Senior High School, Banko
 Osei Tutu Senior High School (OT)
 Bekwai SDA Senior High  School
 Ghana Armed Forces Secondary Technical School, Kumasi
 Beposo Senior High School, Beposo
 Collins Secondary Commercial School, Agog o Asante-Akyem
 Effiduase Senior High School, Effiduase
 Ejisuman Senior High School, Ejisu
 Ejuraman Senior High School, Ejura
 Fomena T.I. Ahmadiyya Senior High School, Adansi Fomena
 Jachie-Pramso Senior High School (Formerly  MIGHTY JAPASS)
 Komfo Anokye Senior High School, Wiamoase
 Kumasi Academy, Asokore-Mampong, Kumasi
 Kumasi Girls' Senior High School
 Kumasi Wesley Girls High School
 Kumasi High School 
 Obuasi Secondary Technical School (O.S.T.S)
 Wesley Senior High School (WEHIS), Bekwai
 Adventist Senior High School (ADASS), Bantama
 Ofoase Kokoben Senior High School (OFKOSS)
 Adventist Girls Senior High School (ADGISS), Ntonso
 Opoku Ware Secondary School, Kumasi.
 St. Louis Senior High School, Oduom
 Nkawie Secondary Technical School.
 Oppong Memorial Senior High School.
 Osei Kyeretwie Senior High School, Kumasi.
 Prempeh College, Kumasi.
 Prince of Peace Girls Senior High School, South Suntreso, Kumasi. 
 Simms Senior High School, Fawoade
 Bonwire Senior High Tech. School.
 St Joseph Senior High School (Ehuren)
 St. Monica's Senior High School, Mampong
 Amaniampong Senior High School, Mampong
 T.I. Ahmadiyya Senior High School, Kumasi
 T.I. Ahmadiyya Girls' Senior High School, Asokore
 Kumasi Technical Institute, Kumasi (KTI)
 Jacobu Senior High School, Jacobu
 Juaben Senior High School, Juaben
 Yaa Asantewaa Girls' Senior High School, Tanoso
 Kumasi Senior High Technical School (K.S.T.S),
 Tepa Senior High School, Tepa. (GREAT TESS).
 Mabang Senior High School, Mabang.

•Aduman Senior High School,(Admass) Aduman
 Dwamena Akenten Senior High School,(DASS) Offinso
Konongo-Odumasi Senior High School

•Al-Azhariya Islamic Senior High School (AZASS) Old tafo_Kumasi

•Islamic Senior High School (I-Sec)Abrepo

Higher education
The Ashanti region has three public universities.  In addition, there are a number of private universities and university colleges spread throughout the region.

Universities

 Kwame Nkrumah University of Science and Technology, Kumasi
 Ghana Baptist University College, Kumasi
 Spiritan University College, Ejisu
 Garden City University College, Kenyasi, Kumasi
 Akenten Appiah-Menka University of Skills Training and Entrepreneurial Development (formerly Kumasi Campus of University of Education, Winneba)
 National Institute Of Information Technology, Kumasi Campus NIIT.
 Kumasi Technical University, K-Poly
 IPMC, Kumasi Campus
 Akrokerri College of Education
 St. Monica's College of Education, Mampong
 Christian Service University College, Odeneho Kwadaso
 Wesley College of Education
 St. Louis College of Education

 Akenten Appiah-Menka University of Skills Training and Entrepreneurial Development (formerly Mampong Campus of University of Education, Winneba)
 Mampong Technical College of Education (MAMTECH)
 S.D.A. College of Education, Agona

Healthcare

 Manhyia Hospital
 Kwadaso SDA Hospital
 Komfo Anokye Teaching Hospital
 Kwame Nkrumah University of Science and Technology Hospital
 Kumasi South Hospital
 First care Hospital
 Tafo Government Hospital
 Suntreso Government Hospital
 West End Hospital

Sports

Kumasi Asante Kotoko
Ashanti Gold SC
King Faisal Babies F.C.
New Edubiase United
Main stadium is Kumasi Sports Stadium

Administrative divisions
The political administration of the region is through the local government system. Under this administration system, the region is divided into 43 MMDA's (made up of 1 Metropolitan, 18 Municipal and 24 Ordinary Assemblies). Each District, Municipal or Metropolitan Assembly, is administered by a Chief Executive and an MP representing the central government but deriving authority from an Assembly headed by a presiding member elected from among the members themselves. The MMDA's were increased from 10 to 18 in 1988; then from 18 to 21 in 2004; then from 21 to 27 in 2008; then from 27 to 30 in 2012; and recently from 30 to 43 in 2018. The current list is as follows:

AKDA - former capital was Foase

Famous native citizens

General I. K Acheampong, former Head of State of Ghana, Taabuom, Atwima
General Akwasi Amankwaa Afrifa, former Head of state, Krobo, Asante-Mampong,
Dr. J.H. Frimpong-Ansah, former Governor of Bank of Ghana, Asante-Mampong,
Yaw Manu-Sarpong, former Deputy of Bank of Ghana, Asante-Nsuta
Joseph Yaw Manu, politician, Asante-Nsuta
Victor Owusu, former leader and Presidential candidate of the Popular Front Party, Asante-Agona
Professor Albert Adu Boahen, leader and Presidential candidate of the New patriotic Party and renowned historian, Asante-Juaben
Alhaji Ibrahim Kwabena Antwi, an academic and first librarian of University for Development Studies, Tamale, Asante-Nsuta,
Abdul Karim Tanko Razak, former best footballer of Africa, Kumasi
Samuel Opoku-Nti, footballer, kumasi,
Kwasi Appiah, footballer and coach of the Ghana National Football Team, the Black Stars, Asante-Bekwai,
Bishop Obinim, Christian occultist, Kumasi
Ohene Kakari, athlete, Kumasi,
Chelsea Sarpong, Business woman, kumasi,
Hannah Afriyie, athlete, Ejisu,
Emmanuel Tuffour (Koora) athlete, Kumasi,
Gerald Asamoa, footballer, Germany National Football Team, Asante-Mampong,
Maulvi Abdul Wahab Adam, Islamic cleric and scholar and former Head and Missionary-In-Charge of Ahmadiyya Movement in Ghana, Adansi-Fomena.
Kojo Safo Kantanka- Asante Bekwai,
Daddy Lumba, highlife musician -Asante Nsuta
Nana Ama McBrown Actress -Kumasi
Sam Otis Brefo Financial Consultant Nsuta/Abonkosu

References

External links 
 

 
Regions of Ghana